Robert B. Hollander Jr. (July 31, 1933 – April 20, 2021) was an American academic and translator, most widely known for his work on Dante Alighieri and Giovanni Boccaccio. He was described by a department chair at Princeton University as "a pioneer in the creation of digital resources for the study of literature" for his work on the electronic Princeton and Dartmouth Dante projects. In 2008, he and his wife, Jean Hollander, co-received a Gold Florin award from the City of Florence for their English translation of Dante's Divine Comedy.

Early life and education 
Hollander was born in Manhattan in 1933. His father was a financier and his mother was a nurse. He graduated from Collegiate School in 1951. 

Hollander received a B.A. in French and English from Princeton University in 1955 and a Ph.D from Columbia University's department of English and Comparative Literature in 1962. His dissertation for the latter was on Edwin Muir.

Career 
Hollander began teaching at Princeton University in 1962, eventually taking emeritus status as a professor in 2003.

In 1982, Hollander began working on the Dartmouth Dante Project, a digital collection of over seventy commentaries on the Divine Comedy dating back to 1322. This was one of the first instances of computer technology being used in literature studies, and encouraged more advances in digital humanities. Forty years later, literature scholar Jeffrey Schnapp called the project a "go-to tool."

Hollander was elected president of the Dante Society of America from 1979 to 1985. He was head of Princeton University's Butler College from 1991 to 1995 and chair of their Department of Comparative Literature from 1994 to 1998.

In 1997, Robert and Jean Hollander began working on an English translation of the Divine Comedy. The couple's Inferno, Purgatorio, and Paradiso were released in 2000, 2003, and 2007 respectively. The translation was critically acclaimed, with novelist Tim Parks calling their Inferno “the finest of them all” and critic Joan Acocella calling their entire Comedy “the best on the market.” Robert's notes to the translation were recognized as being especially thorough, with Acocella estimating that they were "almost thirty times as long as the text."

Personal life 
Robert and Jean Hollander (née Haberman) met as graduate students at Columbia University. They married in 1964 and had three children, one of whom died in infancy. Jean Hollander died in 2019.

From 1977 onwards, Hollander's former students had an annual tradition of returning to the professor's old classroom and reading from Dante's Divine Comedy together.

Death and legacy 
Hollander died on April 20, 2021 at his son's home in Pau'uilo, Hawaii. Italian news agency Agenzia Nazionale Stampa Associata noted that his death was only several months away from the 700th anniversary of Dante's own death. Hollander received full length obituaries in both The Washington Post and The New York Times.

Awards and honors 

 Guggenheim Fellowship, 1970
 National Endowment for the Humanities Senior Fellowship, 1982-83
 Gold medal of the City of Florence, 1988
 John Witherspoon Award in the Humanities, 1988
 Bronze medal of the City of Tours, 1993
 Rockefeller Foundation Grant, 1993
 Honorary Citizen of Certaldo, 1997
 International Nicola Zingarelli Prize, 1999
 Elected to membership in the American Academy of Arts and Sciences, 2005
 Gold Florin award from the City of Florence, 2008

Publications

Books 

 Allegory in Dante's "Commedia." Princeton: Princeton University Press, 1969.
 Boccaccio's Two Venuses. New York: Columbia University Press, 1977.
 Studies in Dante. Ravenna: Longo, 1980.
 Il Virgilio dantesco: tragedia nella "Commedia." [The Dantean Virgil: Tragedy in the “Comedy”] Translated by Anna Maria Castellini & Margherita Frankel. Florence: Olschki, 1983.
 Boccaccio's Last Fiction: "Il Corbaccio." Philadelphia: University of Pennsylvania Press, 1988.
 Dante's Epistle to Cangrande.  Ann Arbor: University of Michigan Press, 1993.
 Boccaccio's Dante and the Shaping Force of Satire. Ann Arbor: University of Michigan Press, 1997.
 Dante Alighieri. Rome: Marzorati-Editalia, 2000.
 Dante. New Haven & London: Yale University Press, 2001. (Paperback reprint, 2015.)
 The Elements of Grammar in Ninety Minutes. New York: Dover Publications, 2011.

Translations 
All of the following co-written with Jean Hollander
 Dante, Inferno. Doubleday, 2000. (Anchor paperback edition: 2002.)
 Dante, Purgatorio. Doubleday, 2003. (Anchor paperback edition: 2004.)
 Dante, Paradiso. Doubleday, 2007. (Anchor paperback edition: 2008.)

See also 
 List of English translations of the Divine Comedy

Notes

References

External links 
 Dartmouth Dante Project
 Princeton Dante Project
 Hollander's commentary to the Divine Comedy
 

1933 births
2021 deaths
American academics
Italian–English translators
Translators of Dante Alighieri
Dante scholars
People from Manhattan
Collegiate School (New York) alumni
Princeton University alumni
Columbia Graduate School of Arts and Sciences alumni
Princeton University faculty